E. & B. Holmes Machinery Company Building, also known as The Cooperage, is a historic factory building located at Buffalo in Erie County, New York.  It is a roughly rectangular brick building composed of three primary sections of four-, three-, and two-stories, which encircle a central courtyard.  The three sections are the Mill Building (ca. 1870), Forge Building (ca. 1910-1912), and Pattern Building (1913).  The E. & B. Holmes Machinery Company revolutionized the barrel making industry by patenting the design and manufacturing of machinery used for mass-producing barrels.  The company operated from 1840 until 2002. 

Plans announced in January 2010 are for the complex to be converted to "live and work" apartments and commercial space by Newark Niagara LLC in partnership with Clinton Brown Company Architecture. More information about the project can be found at River Lofts Buffalo.

It was listed on the National Register of Historic Places in 2009.

References

Industrial buildings and structures on the National Register of Historic Places in New York (state)
Industrial buildings completed in 1870
Buildings and structures in Buffalo, New York
National Register of Historic Places in Buffalo, New York
1870 establishments in New York (state)